Pedioplanis rubens, called commonly the Waterberg sand lizard, reddish sand lizard, and (misleadingly) Ruben's sand lizard, is a species of lizard in the family Lacertidae. The species is endemic to Namibia.

Etymology
The specific name, rubens, which means "tinged with red" in Latin, is not in honor of any person named Ruben, but rather refers to the brick red color of the tail.

Geographic range
P. rubens is found atop the northern portion of the Waterberg Plateau in Namibia.

Habitat
The natural habitat of P. rubens is mopane savanna with red sandstone.

Description
The tail is long, slightly more than twice SVL. Dorsally, the head and body are brown, and the tail is bright brick red. Ventrally, it is lighter-colored.

Reproduction
P. rubens is oviparous.

References

Further reading
Makokha JS, Bauer AM, Mayer W, Matthee CA (2007). "Nuclear and mtDNA-based phylogeny of southern African sand lizards, Pedioplanis (Sauria: Lacertidae)". Molecular Phylogenetics and Evolution 44 (2): 622–633. (Pedioplanis rubens, new status).
Mayer W (1989). "Comments on SZCZERBAK's (1975) catalogue of the African Sand Lizards (Reptilia: Sauria: Eremiainae)". Herpetozoa 1 (3/4): 133–137. (Pedioplanis undata rubens, new combination, p. 135).
Mertens R (1954). "Neue Eidechsen aus Südwest-Afrika". Senckenbergiana 34: 175–183. (Eremias undata rubens, new subspecies, p. 177). (in German).
Szczerbak, "Nikolai N. [sic]" (1989). "Catalogue of the African Sand Lizards (Reptilia: Sauria: Eremiainae: Lampreremias, Pseuderemias, Taenieremias, Mesalina, Meroles)". Herpetozoa 1 (3/4): 119–132. (Mesalina undata rubens, new combination, p. 125). (This paper was originally published in 1975 in Russian as "[Katalog afrikanskih Jascurok]". by the [Academy of Sciences, Institute of Zoology, Museum of Zoology, Kiev, USSR]).

Pedioplanis
Lacertid lizards of Africa
Reptiles of Namibia
Endemic fauna of Namibia
Reptiles described in 1954
Taxa named by Robert Mertens